Martinus Vlietman (25 June 1900 – 4 February 1970) was a Dutch cyclist. He competed in two events at the 1924 Summer Olympics.

See also
 List of Dutch Olympic cyclists

References

External links
 

1900 births
1970 deaths
Dutch male cyclists
Olympic cyclists of the Netherlands
Cyclists at the 1924 Summer Olympics
Cyclists from Amsterdam